Kindt is a surname. It is of German origin and it means child.

It may refer to:

Adèle Kindt (1804–1884), Belgian painter
Christian Sommer Kindt (1815–1903), Norwegian physician and botanical collector; father of Olaf Berg Kindt
David Kindt (c. 1580–1652), German painter
Don Kindt (Sr.) (1925–2000), U.S. American football player
Don Kindt, Jr. (born 1961), U.S. American football player
Edvard Kindt-Larsen (1901–1982), Danish architect and furniture designer
Harri Kindt (1923–1983), Finnish bank manager and vice judge
Hilda Sofie Kindt (1881–1966), Norwegian civil servant and politician
Jean-Michel Kindt (born ?), French actor
John Warren Kindt (born ?), U.S. American professor, author, and gambling critic
 (1886–1967), Finnish land surveying engineer and politician
Lawrence Kindt (1901–1973), Canadian economist and politician
Matt Kindt (born 1973), U.S. American comic book writer, artist, and graphic designer
Olaf Berg Kindt (1850–1935), Norwegian physician; son of Christian Sommer Kindt
Olaf Trampe Kindt (1913–1995), Norwegian barrister
 (1909-2006), German architect

References